Carl August Tidemann (born 7 June 1971) is a highly technical Norwegian Neo-classical metal guitarist and composer, best known for his work in progressive bands like Arcturus and Winds.

Discography

Solo 
 Stylistic Changes (1996)

With Tritonus 
 Evolution Demo (1993) 
 Shadowland Demo (1994)
 A Gathering Of 8 Norwegian Prog Metal Bands Compilation (1997)
 Prison Of Light (2007)

With Arcturus 
 Aspera Hiems Symfonia (1995)
 La Masquerade Infernale (guest) (1997)

With Winds 
 Of Entity and Mind EP (2001)
 Reflections of the I (2002)
 The Imaginary Direction of Time (2004)
 Prominence and Demise (2007)
 Into Transgressions of Thought (2015)

With Fleurety 
 Department of Apocalyptic Affairs (guest) (2000)

With Diabla 
 Everything Passes (studio session work) (2001)

References

External links
 Winds Official Site
 Carl August Tidemann Official Site
 Arcturus Official Site
 Tritonus Official Site
 Diabla Official Site
 Fleurety Official Site

Living people
Norwegian rock guitarists
Norwegian black metal musicians
Place of birth missing (living people)
Musicians Institute alumni
1971 births
Arcturus (band) members
Winds (band) members
21st-century Norwegian guitarists